The tornado outbreak of January 23–24, 1997 resulted in 16 tornadoes across the Deep South. Damage in excess of $16 million occurred across several states, with the worst damage in Tennessee and Alabama. Over 300 buildings, including homes, businesses, and public facilities were either damaged or completely destroyed. An F2 tornado killed one person in Tuscaloosa, Alabama. The strongest storm in the outbreak was an F4 tornado that destroyed dozens of homes in and near Murfreesboro, Tennessee.

Meteorological synopsis
On January 23, an upper-level trough moved across the Great Plains with a front stalled over portions of Texas and Louisiana, prompting the Storm Prediction Center to forecast a slight risk of severe thunderstorms across the Gulf Coast states. Two tornadoes, rated F1 and F2 respectively, damaged homes in Texas and Louisiana.

On January 24, 1997 the trough continued across the Mississippi and Tennessee valleys. A warm and moist airmass covered much of central Alabama. Morning temperatures across most of the state were in the lower 60's with a dewpoint of approximately 60 °F (15-16 °C). Meanwhile, a warm front was moving from Louisiana and into central and southwest Alabama. By noon, the skies had begun to darken as a cold front trailed over areas of northeast Texas. These conditions prompted the Storm Prediction Center to issue a moderate risk outlook across portions of Louisiana, Mississippi, and Alabama with a slight risk outlook covering a region from Louisiana to Tennessee, North Carolina, and Florida.

The threat of severe weather across middle Tennessee was first identified by the early afternoon of January 23. A special weather statement was issued to highlight the severe weather threat for middle Tennessee for the afternoon of January 24. Another special weather statement was issued early on January 24 to continue to alert the public of the possibility of severe weather.

The tornado outbreak unfolded quickly across middle Tennessee during the early afternoon of January 24. Shortly after 330 PM, Doppler radar indicated a tornado as severe weather spotters reported a funnel cloud just east of Centerville, Tennessee. A tornado warning was issued at 333 PM for northern Maury and Williamson Counties as the tornado moved toward the more heavily populated area of Franklin. By 344 PM, another tornado warning was issued for Maury County as another tornado was indicated by Doppler radar in western Maury County, about 15 miles west of Columbia.

By 422 PM, a tornado warning was issued for Rutherford and extended for Williamson County until 515 PM. Three tornadoes were indicated by Doppler radar from about 10 miles northeast and 5 miles west of Franklin, Tennessee and also along the Maury-Williamson County line. Several weather spotters, amateur radio operators, and sheriffs' deputies were maintaining contact with NWSO Nashville and provided excellent updates of the tornadoes, which coincided with Doppler radar indications.

A very important severe weather statement was issued shortly after 430 PM highlighting the multiple tornadoes in Williamson County. This statement provided crucial information regarding areas within the Nashville metropolitan area which were in the paths of the tornadoes (including heavily populated areas such as Murfreesboro in Rutherford County).

At 440 PM, the northernmost tornado about 5 miles northeast of Franklin continued to maintain itself, prompting a tornado warning for Wilson county valid until 545 PM.

Another crucial severe weather statement was issued at 454 PM to indicate tornado locations and to pinpoint towns along the tornado paths. This particular statement mentioned that tornadoes would move to near Murfreesboro between 500 and 515 and to just southeast of Lebanon by 515 PM.

At around 500 PM, an F2 tornado touched down near Smyrna in Rutherford County causing damage to Smyrna Middle as it moved southeast of Lebanon in Wilson County to near Watertown in southeast Wilson County at the predicted 515 PM time. Rutherford County residents had a 48-minute tornado warning lead time and Wilson county a 20-minute lead time.

Confirmed tornadoes

January 23 event

January 24 event

Tuscaloosa, Alabama

Just before 5:00 PM on January 24, a tornado touched down on the east side of the Warrior River south of Interstate 59 and west of County Road 95. Initial damage included snapped tree branches and shingles torn off of the roof of an apartment complex. As it crossed U.S. Route 82 and Interstate 59, the tornado quickly became stronger, with two businesses, Books-a-Million and Gayfers suffering roof damage. Moving in a northeast direction, the tornado then entered the Woodland Hills area, destroying outbuildings and damaging several homes. A 71-year old retired physician was killed when a tree fell onto the windshield of his pickup truck. It was the first tornado-related fatality in the United States in 1997.

The tornado ultimately reached F2 intensity as it entered Five Points East. The manager of the Food World grocery store at that location saw the approaching tornado and ushered customers into the store. Many cars in the Food World parking lot were destroyed, including one that was tossed into the backyard of a neighboring house while another was tossed through the roof of the store. At least one other business, a Big-B location, also suffered damage.

After impacting the Food World and Big B stores, the tornado continued into the Lynn Haven residential area damaging ten to twelve homes. Damage to these homes ranged from partial to complete roof loss. The tornado then crossed the Tuscaloosa Memorial Gardens Cemetery and State Road 216, entering the Summerfield subdivision. Six to eight houses in the subdivision received minor damage while other structures including a few mobile homes and a small grocery store were destroyed. The tornado dissipated shortly afterwards in a wooded area just north of State Road 216.

A tornado warning was issued for Tuscaloosa County at 5:11 PM, shortly before the tornado dissipated. The warning would remain in effect for another 49 minutes.

The tornado was on the ground for approximately 15 minutes, with a path length of 10 miles long by 200 yards wide. The EMA of Tuscaloosa County concluded that up to 100 structures sustained some degree of damage, ranging from roof damage to complete destruction. The sole fatality that occurred during the tornado was the first tornado-related fatality to occur in 1997, and the first in Tuscaloosa since the 1932 Deep South tornado outbreak killed 37 people in the area.

The December 2000 Tuscaloosa tornado, which occurred almost three years later, would follow a similar path to the 1997 twister. The 2000 tornado was rated at F4 intensity and killed 11 people.

See also

December 2000 Tuscaloosa tornado
2011 Tuscaloosa–Birmingham tornado
Tornadoes of 1997
Tornado intensity and damage

References

External links 
 The Alabama Weather Blog

Tornadoes of 1997
Tornadoes in Alabama
Tornadoes in Mississippi
Tornadoes in Tennessee
F4 tornadoes by date
Tornado outbreak